Government Medical College, Kota  is a public medical college in the city of Kota in the Indian state of Rajasthan. It has one of the largest medical college campuses in Rajasthan. The Students' Union publishes Rajasthan's only medical newsletter (for the general public): Udayan.

History
The college started in 1992 in a portion of ESI hospital, Kota with Dr. R.L. Ajmera as its principal. It moved into its own spacious campus in 1997. MBS hospital and JayKay Lon were the associated hospitals while NMC hospital is the latest addition.

The number of MBBS seats were 50 at the beginning which has now been increased to 250, from 2019 batch. Besides MBBS, the college offers MD/MS and superspeciality programmes.

See also
 Colleges and institutes in India

External links
 Government Medical College, Kota

References

Medical colleges in Rajasthan
Colleges in Kota, Rajasthan
Educational institutions established in 1992
1992 establishments in Rajasthan
Affiliates of Rajasthan University of Health Sciences